Sarah Guillemard is a Canadian provincial politician, who was elected as the Member of the Legislative Assembly of Manitoba for the riding of Fort Richmond in the 2016 election. She is a member of the Progressive Conservative party currently serving as the minister of Advanced Education and Training. She previously served as minister of Mental Health and Community Wellness. She defeated NDP incumbent Kerri Irvin-Ross in the election. She was re-elected in the 2019 provincial election.

References

Living people
Politicians from Winnipeg
Women MLAs in Manitoba
Progressive Conservative Party of Manitoba MLAs
Members of the Executive Council of Manitoba
Women government ministers of Canada
21st-century Canadian women politicians
Year of birth missing (living people)